Anagennisi Lythrodonta is a Cypriot association football club based in Lythrodontas, located in the Nicosia District. Its stadium is the Anagennisi Lythrodonta Ground and its colours are red and white. It has 13 participations in Cypriot Fourth Division.

References

Football clubs in Cyprus
Association football clubs established in 1944
1944 establishments in Cyprus